Fiverr is a global online marketplace for freelance services. Fiverr’s platform connects freelancers (sellers) to people or businesses looking to hire (buyers). Listings on Fiverr are diverse and range from "get a well-designed business card" to "help with HTML, JavaScript, CSS, and jQuery". The highest-paying jobs on Fiverr include website design, social media manager, proofreading and copywriting, and resume writing. Fiverr takes its name from the $5 asking price attached to all tasks when the company was founded in 2010 in Tel Aviv. These days many sellers charge much more.

Freelancers work from a variety of workplaces, ranging from home to office. The platform is global, with freelancers and businesses spanning an estimated 160 countries. Fiverr went public in 2019. Today it is a multi-billion-dollar global marketplace.

History 
Fiverr was founded by Micha Kaufman and Shai Wininger. The founders came up with the concept of a marketplace that would provide a two-sided market for people to buy and sell a variety of digital services typically offered by freelance contractors. Services offered on the site include writing, translation, graphic design, video editing and programming. Fiverr's services start at US$5, and can go up to thousands of dollars.

In December 2013, Fiverr released their iOS app in the Apple App Store, and in March 2014 the company published their Android app in the Google Play store.

In October 2015, Amazon.com started legal action against 1,114 Fiverr sellers it claims provide fake reviews on the US version of its website. Fiverr did not dispute Amazon's allegations and stated: "As Amazon noted, we have worked closely together to remove services that violate our terms of use, and respond promptly to any reports of inappropriate content." Amazon filed suit after an undercover sting.

In November 2015, Fiverr announced that it had raised US$60 million in a Series D round of funding, led by Square Peg Capital. The round brought their total funding to date to $110 million.

In June 2019, it listed on NYSE. On February 18, 2021, the company reported $189.5 million in revenue for the 2020 fiscal year, a 77% increase from the previous fiscal year ($107.1 million).

Products 
Launched in 2020, Fiverr Business helps teams at larger companies manage their workflows with freelancers and remote workers.

Also in 2020, Fiverr launched Logo Maker, a tool powered by artificial intelligence for designing company logos.

Acquisitions 
In 2017, Fiverr acquired video creation marketplace VeedMe.

In January 2018, AND.CO, maker of software for freelancers, was acquired by Fiverr. Then CEO Micha Kaufman said at the time that many of AND CO's capabilities, such as invoicing, are "baked into" the Fiverr marketplace, but "the vast majority of freelancing is happening offline"—and Fiverr wants to enable those offline relationships. AND.CO was converted into Fiverr Workspace in 2021. 

In February 2019, Fiverr acquired premium subscription-based content marketing platform, ClearVoice which was founded in 2014.

In August 2020, Fiverr acquired SLT Consulting, a boutique digital marketing agency specializing in social media marketing, search and SEO, as well as brand and content marketing. The agency was founded by Sharon Lee Thony, who built its business using Fiverr.

In February 2021, Fiverr acquired creative talent marketplace Working Not Working.

In October 2021, Fiverr acquired education and training platform CreativeLive.

In November of 2021, Fiverr acquired freelance management platform, Stoke Talent, for $95M.

Criticism
In 2017, Fiverr was criticized for advertisements portraying unhealthy living and excesses in work behaviors as ideals to live up to.
The company has also been criticized for undervaluing freelance labor and pushing down prices.

See also 
 E-lancing
 Gig worker
 Freelancer.com

References

External links
 

2019 initial public offerings
Companies based in Tel Aviv
Companies listed on the New York Stock Exchange
Freelance marketplace websites
Online marketplaces of Israel
Internet properties established in 2010
Israeli brands
Israeli companies established in 2010
Telecommuting